Andrei Yureyevich Granichka (born 18 January 1997) is a Russian Paralympic swimmer who represented Russian Paralympic Committee athletes at the 2020 Summer Paralympics.

Career
Granichka represented Russian Paralympic Committee athletes at the 2020 Summer Paralympics where he won a gold medal in the men's 100 metre backstroke SB5 and a silver medal in the men's 200 metre individual medley SM6.

References

1997 births
Living people
Paralympic swimmers of Russia
Swimmers at the 2020 Summer Paralympics
Medalists at the 2020 Summer Paralympics
Paralympic medalists in swimming
Paralympic gold medalists for the Russian Paralympic Committee athletes
Paralympic silver medalists for the Russian Paralympic Committee athletes
Russian male backstroke swimmers
Russian male medley swimmers
S6-classified Paralympic swimmers
20th-century Russian people
21st-century Russian people